Virtual Researcher on Call (VROC) is a Canadian educational program administered by Partners in Research.  The program connects students with knowledge partners — researchers and professionals — in health and natural sciences, technology, engineering, and mathematics (STEM fields) through video conferencing and video podcasts.

Video conferencing
Video conferencing technology is used to connect researchers and professionals in the STEM fields with elementary and secondary school classrooms for real-time, interactive discussion.

Partners
VROC is partnered with over 40 universities, colleges, and institutions as well as school boards across the country.

Funding
VROC began with a "Reaching Higher" grant from the Ontario Ministry of Training, Colleges and Universities in 2006 under the Dalton McGuinty government.

In 2011, Partners in Research was awarded a nearly million-dollar grant from the Federal Economic Development Agency for Southern Ontario to teach southern Ontarian students about careers in science, technology, engineering, and mathematics.

Partners in Research hosts a national annual awards reception and ceremony entitled The PIR National Awards to celebrate Canadian research in the STEM fields. Proceeds from this evening support the Virtual Researcher On Call Program.

Recognition
In 2006 VROC was named a "New and Noteworthy Initiative" by the Canadian Education Association.

VROC was awarded the ORION Discovery Award of Merit in 2008.

References

External links
VROC web page

Educational organizations based in Canada
Science education in Canada